Piz Cancian is a mountain in the Bernina Range of the Alps, located on the border between Italy and the Switzerland.

On its eastern Swiss side the mountain overlooks Lake Poschiavo and the Val di Poschiavo. The Swiss side of the mountain lies within the municipality of Poschiavo and the canton of Graubünden, whilst the Italian side is in the province of Sondrio and the region of Lombardy.

References

External links
 Piz Cancian on Hikr

Bernina Range
Mountains of Graubünden
Mountains of Lombardy
Mountains of the Alps
Alpine three-thousanders
International mountains of Europe
Italy–Switzerland border
Mountains of Switzerland
Poschiavo